Wang Sheng may refer to:

Wang Sheng (Han dynasty) ( 94–125), wet nurse of Emperor An of Han
Wang Sheng (general) (1915–2006), Kuomintang general and political figure
Wang Sheng (footballer) (born 1981), Chinese footballer